Himantolophus azurlucens is a species of footballfish, a type of anglerfish. It is endemic to the eastern central Pacific Ocean and has been located off the coast of Panama.

References

Himantolophidae
Deep sea fish
Taxa named by William Beebe
Taxa named by Jocelyn Crane
Fish described in 1947